This article shows all participating team squads at the 2009 FIVB Volleyball Men's World Grand Champions Cup.

The following is the Brazil roster in the 2009 FIVB Volleyball Men's World Grand Champions Cup.

The following is the Cuba roster in the 2009 FIVB Volleyball Men's World Grand Champions Cup.

The following is the Egypt roster in the 2009 FIVB Volleyball Men's World Grand Champions Cup.

The following is the Iran roster in the 2009 FIVB Volleyball Men's World Grand Champions Cup.

The following is the Japan roster in the 2009 FIVB Volleyball Men's World Grand Champions Cup.

The following is the Poland roster in the 2009 FIVB Volleyball Men's World Grand Champions Cup.

References

G
FIVB Men's Volleyball World Grand Champions Cup squads